{{Infobox football biography
| name = Brayden Shaw
| image = https://m.zimbio.com/photos/Brayden+Shaw
| caption = 
| fullname = Brayden Lewis Shaw
| birth_date = 
| birth_place = Blackburn, England
| height = 
| position = Midfielder

| youthyears1 = –2015
| youthclubs1 = Bury
| years1 = 2015–2016
| clubs1 = Bury
| caps1 = 0
| goals1 = 0
| years2 = 2016–2017
| clubs2 = Accrington Stanley
| caps2 = 6
| goals2 = 0
| years3 = 2016–2017
| clubs3 = → Bangor City (loan)
| caps3 = 18
| goals3 = 3
| years4 = 2017–2018
| clubs4 = Bangor City
| caps4 = 22
| goals4 = 4
| years5 = 2018–2020
| clubs5 = Cardiff City
| caps5 = 0
| goals5 = 0
| years6 = 2020–2021
| clubs6 = Connah's Quay Nomads
| caps6 = 5
| goals6 = 0
| years7 = 2021

Brayden Lewis Shaw (born 25 February 1997) is an English footballer who plays as a midfielder

Career
Shaw graduated through the Bury youth system, signing a six-month professional contract with the club in June 2015. Shaw left Gigg Lane following the expiration of his short-term deal with Bury.

In January 2016, Shaw signed a short-term deal with League Two side Accrington Stanley following a successful one-month trial spell. He made his debut in the Football League on 20 February, coming on as an 80th-minute substitute for Romuald Boco in a 2–1 victory over Oxford United at the Manor Ground. During his time with Stanley, Shaw was loaned to Welsh Premier League side Bangor City, where he was named Welsh Premier League Player of the Month for December 2016. Shaw was offered a new contract at the end of the season but signed for Welsh Premier League side Bangor City for a league record fee.

He signed for National League North strugglers AFC Telford United on non-contract terms after impressing on trial.

Statistics

References

External links

1997 births
Living people
English footballers
Association football midfielders
Bury F.C. players
Accrington Stanley F.C. players
Bangor City F.C. players
Cardiff City F.C. players
Connah's Quay Nomads F.C. players
Bamber Bridge F.C. players
AFC Telford United players
English Football League players
National League (English football) players
Cymru Premier players